Frederick Landis Jr. (January 17, 1912 – March 1, 1990) was a judge of the United States Court of International Trade.

Education and career

Born January 17, 1912, in Logansport, Indiana, Landis received an Artium Baccalaureus degree in 1932 from Indiana University Bloomington and a Bachelor of Laws in 1934 from Indiana University Maurer School of Law. He entered private practice in Logansport from 1935 to 1955. He was a Deputy Prosecutor for the Twenty-Ninth Judicial District in Indiana from 1935 to 1936. He was the Prosecutor for the Twenty-Ninth Judicial District from 1938 to 1940. He was a United States Naval Reserve lieutenant from 1942 to 1946. He was a member of the Indiana House of Representatives from 1950 to 1952. He was member of the Indiana Senate from 1952 to 1955. He was a Justice of the Indiana Supreme Court from 1955 to 1965.

Federal judicial service

Landis was nominated by President Lyndon B. Johnson on October 6, 1965, to a seat on the United States Customs Court vacated by Judge Charles Drummond Lawrence. He was confirmed by the United States Senate on October 15, 1965, and received his commission on October 16, 1965. He was reassigned by operation of law to the United States Court of International Trade on November 1, 1980, to a new seat authorized by 94 Stat. 1727. He assumed senior status on December 31, 1983. His service terminated on March 1, 1990, due to his death in Carmel, Indiana.

References

Sources
 

1912 births
1990 deaths
Judges of the United States Court of International Trade
Indiana University Maurer School of Law alumni
People from Carmel, Indiana
Judges of the United States Customs Court
United States federal judges appointed by Lyndon B. Johnson
20th-century American judges